No Tellin' Lies is the second album by New Orleans-based hard rock trio Zebra, released in 1984 by Atlantic Records. The album was a commercial disappointment, peaking at #84. However, "Bears" did get some radio airplay on hard rock stations.

The original compact disc version was made in West Germany for the US market in 1984 and is very rare. It was reissued in 2007 as a 2-on-1 CD along with the third Zebra album 3.V, which had been deleted as well. Long out-of-print in single disc form for decades, No Tellin' Lies became available again as a stand-alone CD in 2013, with separate reissues from the UK-based Rock Candy Records and as part of a reissue of the first three Zebra albums in Japan.

Track listing

Personnel

Zebra
Randy Jackson  - guitars, lead vocals (all but 9), keyboards
Felix Hanemann - bass, backing and lead (9) vocals, keyboards
Guy Gelso - drums, backing vocals, percussion

Additional musicians
Stan Bronstein: Saxophone, Synthesizers
Michael Finlayson: Programming
George Small: Piano (2, 7)
Bob Rosa: Programming

Production
Produced By Jack Douglas
Engineers: Ron Cote, Bill Dooley, Michael Finlayson, Bob Rosa
Assistant Engineers: Eddie Garcia, Roey Shamir
Mixing: Bill Dooley

Chart history

References

Zebra (band) albums
1984 albums
Atlantic Records albums
Albums produced by Jack Douglas (record producer)